Escudilla Bonita is a census-designated place in Catron County, New Mexico, United States. Its population was 119 as of the 2010 census.

Geography

Demographics

Education
The school district is Quemado Schools.

References

Census-designated places in New Mexico
Census-designated places in Catron County, New Mexico